The 2016 season for  began in January at the Tour de San Luis. As a UCI WorldTeam, they were automatically invited and obligated to send a squad to every event in the UCI World Tour.

Team roster

Riders who joined the team for the 2016 season

Riders who left the team during or after the 2015 season

Season victories

Footnotes

References

External links
 

2016 road cycling season by team
UAE Team Emirates
2016 in Italian sport